Sputnik 11 may refer to:

 Kosmos 1 - first Soviet satellite in the Earth Satellite series
 Vostok 1 - first spacecraft to carry a human